Sno*Drift is a rally racing event held in Montmorency County, Michigan, annually, with headquarters in Atlanta, Michigan.  The event is currently the first Rally America National Rally Championship event of the season.  Currently the event is organized into three distinct rallies:  the national championship event covering both days of rallying, and two regional rally events each covering one of the two days.  Competitors may be entered in any or all of these events simultaneously.

Sno*Drift is a winter rally, run primarily on snow-covered gravel surface roads, and is usually held in January.  The winners of the 2009 Sno*Drift Rally were Travis Pastrana and Christian Edstrom of Maryland, driving a Subaru Impreza WRX STI. This team also won the event in 2007, but in 2008, they were leading but did not finish the event as they encountered a deer on the next to last stage.

History

A national event in the 1970s and 1980s 
Sno*Drift was first held in 1973 as a National event as part of the SCCA Performance Rally series near Grayling, Michigan.  Chaired by Tim Steiner, the event was won by the team of Erhard Dahm and John Campbell driving a Jeep Wagoneer, with Gene Henderson and Ken Pogue finished 2nd in a similar vehicle.  Scott Harvey and Tom King placed third in a Dodge Colt.  Of the 38 teams starting the event, 24 finished.

The event was repeated the next year with Henderson and Pogue rising to win over Dahm with new co-driver Tom Grimshaw.  Third was again captured by Harvey, who also had a new co-driver (Wayne Zitkus).  The final Sno*Drift of the period was held in 1975, and was won by Harvey and Zitkus, this time with a Dodge Ramcharger, while second place was claimed by Tom Tolles and Virginia Reese in a Volvo 122S and third by Bob Hourihan and Doug Shepherd, also in a Volvo 122S.

Sno*Drift was not held again until 1979 when it again became a national event for the SCCA.  This running saw 48 teams enter, of whom 31 finished.  Taisto Heinonen and Tom Burgess won the event in a Toyota Celica GT while Doug Leverton and Greg Wilkinson placed second in their Datsun 510 and Scott Harvey and Randy Graves finished third in a Dodge Aspen.

46 teams entered the 1980 event, while only 24 finished.  Overall winners were Guy Light and Jim Brandt in a Jeep CJ-7, followed by John Buffum and Doug Shepherd in a Triumph TR7 and by Dick Turner and Tom Grimshaw in an International Scout.  1980's winner in the production class was the team of Erik Zenz and Brian Berg in a Saab 99L followed by Curt Spicer and Tom Hudak, also in a Saab 99, and by Roger Suppes and Woody Crutchfield in a Toyota Corolla.

Sno*Drift was held in 1981 with 49 teams entering and 39 finishing.  Jean Paul Perusse and Jim Brandt took the overall win in their Peugeot 504, while second place was claimed by Randy Black and Fred Baker in a Datsun 510, and third by Bjorn Anderson and Randy Weiser in a Toyota Celica.  Niall Leslie and Doug Martin captured the 1981 production class win in a Datsun 200 SX, with second in class going to Gene Henderson and Jim Kloosterman, and third to Guy Light and Jim Brandt, with both teams driving a pair of AMC Eagle SX/4 coupes.

Sno*Drift saw 50 entries in 1982 with 31 finishing the rally.  John Buffum and Tom Grimshaw took first with an Audi Quattro, with second going to Rod Millen and John Bellefleur in a Mazda RX-7 and third to Doug Shepherd and Jim Roller in a Colt.  The production class winners were Guy Light and Jim Brandt in an Oldsmobile Omega, followed by Gene Henderson and Jim Kloosterman in their AMC Eagle SX/4, and Erik Zenz and Lawson Smith in a Saab 99 EMS.

1983, marking the eighth running of the event was also the last of the period run as a national event.  40 teams entered and 29 finished, with Rod Millen and Michael Parris winning overall in their RX-7, with Mark Klos and Andrew Klos taking second in a Jeep C101 and Don Jankowski and Karen Landau finishing third in a Dodge Charger.  The Production class was led by a pair of Chargers, the first driven by Cal Landau and Craig Marr, and the second by Dan Coughnour and Eric Marcus with Gene Henderson and Jim Kloosterman finishing third in their AMC Eagle SX/4.

Years as a non-national event 

Sno*Drift was run in 1984, but was downgraded from a national event to a coefficient 2 divisional event of the, with 28 entries and 20 finishers.  The event was held in December as part of the 1985 divisional series.  Winners were Tom Bell and Mary Jo Czyzio in a Datsun 510, with second going to Erik Zenz and Steve Nowicki in a Saab 99 and third place awarded to Robert Parks and Jerry Tobin in an Alfa Romeo GTV.

Sno*Drift was run again in 1991, but as a time-speed-distance rally.  14 teams took part, with Gene Henderson and Jim Mickle winning in a BMW 325ix.  This team won again in 1992 when the event was repeated.

Restoration as a national event in the 1990s 

After a long period of dormancy, Sno*Drift was run again as national event for the SCCA, although not as a full event, but instead at 60%, while also counting as coefficient 3 divisional event.  In 1997, it was held in Montmorency County, Michigan, with 27 entries and 21 finishers.  Overall winners were Frank Sprongl and Dan Sprongl in an Audi S2, followed by Steve Gingras and Bill Westrick and by Cal Landau and Eric Marcus, both in the Mitsubishi Eclipse.  Group 5 winners were Mike Villemure and Rene Villemure driving a Volkswagen Beetle, followed by Mike Hurst and Lynn Dillon driving a Pontiac Sunbird and by Gail Truess and Paul Truess in a Chevrolet Citation.  Group 2 winners were Gerald Sweet and Stuart Spark in a Saab 99 EMS, followed by Wayne Prochaska and Annette Prochaska in a Volkswagen Golf and Art Burmeister and Randy Moore in a Volkswagen GTI.  The Production GT class win went to Steve Gingras and Bill Westrick in a Mitsubishi Eclipse followed by another Eclipse driven by Cal Landau and Eric Marcus and an Eagle Talon piloted by Brian Pepp and Dean Rushford.  The Production class was won by a Ford Escort GT driven by Tad Ohtake and Bob Martin followed by a Honda Civic driven by Jay Kowalik and Jeff Wheeler.  It was intended to run the event in 1998, although this was cancelled due to extreme weather conditions.

1999 saw Sno*Drift run again as a 60% national event and coefficient 3 divisional event.  Overall victory went to Tom Ottey and Pam McGarvey in a Mazda 323 GTX, followed up by Jon Kemp and Brian Maxwell in an Audi 4000 Quattro and by Peter Lahm and Matt Chester in a Mitsubishi Lancer Evo IV.  Group 5 was won by Henry Krolikowski and Cindy Krolikowski in a Dodge Shadow GT, followed by Mark Utecht and Diane Sargent in a Dodge Omni and by Jeremy Butts and Peter Jacobs in a Plymouth Arrow.  Group 2 winners were Wayne and Annette Prochaska in a Volkswagen Golf followed by David S. Cizmas and David L. Cizmas in a Suzuki Swift and by Art Burmeister and Randy Moore in their GTI.  Ottey and McGarvey also took the Proguction GT victory, with Chris Czyzio and Eric Carlson in second and Cal Landau and Eric Marcus in third, both in Eclipses.  Production class victory went to a pair of Volkswagen GTIs, the first driven by Karl Scheible and Gail McGuire, and the second by Brian Vinson and Richard Beels.  Third was captured by a Plymouth Neon ACR piloted by Evan Moen and Ronald Moen.

Becoming a full national event 

2000 marked Sno*Drift's promotion to a full national event.  The national event, part of the SCCA's ProRally series, would run all of the stages that comprised the rally.  In addition, there would be two SCCA ClubRally events.  The first, titled simply Sno, covered the first portion of the rally's stages, and was considered a coefficient 2 club rally, while the second, entitled Drift, covered the remaining stages and was scored as a coefficient 3 club rally.  Competitors could enter any or all of these rallies and score points the appropriate series.  the 2000 and 2001 event results were as follows (results are listed in the format - driver / co-driver / vehicle):

 2000 Sno*Drift national rally (41 entrants/28 finishers)
 Overall
 1. Paul Choiniere / Jeff Becker / Hyundai Tiburon
 2. Karl Scheible / Russ Hughes / Mitsubishi Lancer
 3. Pete Lahm / Matt Chester / Mitsubishi Lancer Evo IV
 Group N
 1. Karl Scheible / Russ Hughes / Mitsubishi Lancer
 Group 5
 1. Mark Utecht / Brenda Corneliusen / Dodge Omni
 2. Mike Hurst / Rob Bohn / Pontiac Sunbird
 3. Bryan Hourt / Peter Cardimen / Honda Civic
 Group 2
 1. Douglas Davenport / Lea Hoffa / Volkswagen Golf
 Production GT
 1. Chris Czyzio / Eric Carlson / Mitsubishi Eclipse
 2. Steve Gingras / Bill Westrick / Eagle Talon
 Production
 1. Brian Vinson / Luke Stuart / Volkswagen GTI
 2. Evan Moen / Kurt Winkelman / Chrysler Neon
 2000 Sno Club Coefficient 2 Rally (30 entrants; 20 finishers)
 Overall
 1. Chris Czyzio / Eric Carlson / Mitsubishi Eclipse
 2. Mark Utecht / Brenda Corneliusen / Dodge Omni
 3. Sylvester Stepniewski / Adam Pelc / Audi Quattro
 Group 5
 1. Mark Utecht / Brenda Corneliusen / Dodge Omni
 2. Colin McCleery / Jeff Secor / Volkswagen GTI
 3. Rene Villemure / Mike Villemure / Volkswagen Beetle
 Group 2
 1. Douglas Davenport / Lea Hoffa / Volkswagen Golf
 2. Charles Langan / Hughie Langan / Ford Escort
 Production GT
 1. Chris Czyzio / Eric Carlson / Mitsubishi Eclipse
 2. Scott Harvey, Jr. / Bob Martin / Eagle Talon
 Production
 1. Jouni Pohjolainen / John Matikainen / Nissan NX 200
 2. Ryan Brooks / Shanti Traskowski / Acura Integra
 2000 Drift Club Coefficient 3 Rally
 1. Chris Czyzio / Eric Carlson / Mitsubishi Eclipse
 2. Mark Utecht / Brenda Corneliusen / Dodge Omni
 3. Sylvester Stepniewski / Adam Pelc / Audi Quattro
 Group 5
 1. Mark Utecht / Brenda Corneliusen / Dodge Omni
 2. Rene Villemure / Mike Villemure / Volkswagen Beetle
 3. Colin McCleery / Jeff Secor / Volkswagen GTI
 Group 2
 1. Douglas Davenport / Lea Hoffa / Volkswagen Golf
 2. Joshua Scott / Roxanne Slancik / Volkswagen GTI
 3. Mark Brown / Ole Holter / Toyota Corolla
 Production GT
 1. Chris Czyzio / Eric Carlson / Mitsubishi Eclipse
 2. Scott Harvey, Jr. / Bob Martin / Eagle Talon
 Production
 1. Jouni Pohjolainen / John Matikainen / Nissan NX 200
 2. Tom Young / Jim LeBeau / Dodge Neon ACR
 3. Ryan Brooks / Shanti Traskowski / Acura Integra
 2001 Sno*Drift National Rally
 Overall
 1. Paul Choiniere / Jeff Becker / Hyundai Tiburon
 2. Mark Lovell / Steve Turvey / Subaru WRX STi
 3. Seamus Burke / Frank Cunningham / Mitsubishi Lancer Evo IV
 Group N
 1. Mark Lovell / Steve Turvey / Subaru WRX STi
 2. Karl Scheible / Brian Maxwell / Subaru Impreza
 3. Henry Krolikowski / Cindy Krolikowski / Subaru WRX STi
 Group 5
 1. Tad Ohtake / Bob Martin / Ford Escort
 2. Mike Hurst / Rob Bohn / Pontiac Sunbird
 3. Colin McCleery / Jeff Secor / Volkswagen GTI
 Group 2
 1. Eric Burmeister / Mark Buskirk / Volkswagen GTI
 2. Matthew Johnson / Eric Adams / Volkswagen GTI
 3. Thomas Lawless / Brendan Lawless / Honda Civic
 Production GT
 1. Mark Utecht / Brenda Lewis / Mitsubishi Eclipse
 2. Gail Truess / Pattie Hughes-Mayer / Mazda 323 GTX
 3. Bruce Perry / Phil Barnes / Eagle Talon
 Production
 1. Scott Carlborn / Dale Ewald / Jeep Comanche
 2. Tom Young / Jim LeBeau / Dodge Neon ACR
 2001 Sno Club Coefficient 2 Rally (32 entries; 26 finishers)
 Overall
 1. Mark Utecht / Brenda Lewis / Mitsubishi Eclipse
 2. Bruce Perry / Phil Barnes / Eagle Talon
 3. Chris Czyzio / Eric Carlson / Mitsubishi Eclipse
 Group 5
 1. Mike Hurst / Rob Bohn / Pontiac Sunbird
 2. Colin McCleery / Jeff Secor / Volkswagen GTI
 3. Wiktor Biegalski / Andy Malikowski / Mitsubishi Eclipse
 Group 2
 1. Thomas Lawless / Brendan Lawless / Honda Civic
 2. Phil Smith / Dallas Smith / MGB-GT
 3. Brad Hawkins / Adrian Wintle / Volkswagen Golf GT
 Production GT
 1. Mark Utecht / Brenda Lewis / Mitsubishi Eclipse
 2. Bruce Perry / Phil Barnes / Eagle Talon
 3. Chris Czyzio / Eric Carlson / Mitsubishi Eclipse
 Production
 1. Jim Cox / Kaarii Louise Cox / Chevrolet S-10
 2. Ryan Brooks / Randy Berdan / Acura Integra
 2001 Drift Club Coefficient 2 Rally (32 entries; 26 finishers)
 Overall
 1. Mark Utecht / Brenda Lewis / Mitsubishi Eclipse
 2. Bruce Perry / Phil Barnes / Eagle Talon
 3. Chris Czyzio / Eric Carlson / Mitsubishi Eclipse
 Group 5
 1. Mike Hurst / Rob Bohn / Pontiac Sunbird
 2. Colin McCleery / Jeff Secor / Volkswagen GTI
 3. Jerry Brownell / Jim Windsor / Chevrolet Citation
 Group 2
 1. Thomas Lawless / Brendan Lawless / Honda Civic
 2. Phil Smith / Dallas Smith / MGB-GT
 3. Phil Schmidt / Steve Irwin / Toyota MR2
 Production GT
 1. Mark Utecht / Brenda Lewis / Mitsubishi Eclipse
 2. Bruce Perry / Phil Barnes / Eagle Talon
 3. Chris Czyzio / Eric Carlson / Mitsubishi Eclipse
 Production
 1. Jim Cox / Kaarii Louise Cox / Chevrolet S-10
 2. Ryan Brooks / Randy Berdan / Acura Integra
 3. William Tremmel / Peter Coleman / Volkswagen GTI
 2002 Sno*Drift national rally (46 starters; 34 finishers)
 Overall
 1. Frank Sprongl / Dan Sprongl / Hyundai Tiburon
 2. Mark Lovell / Steve Turvey / Subaru WRX
 3. Mark Higgins / Michael Gibson / Hyundai Tiburon
 Group N
 1. Mark Utecht / Jeff Secor / Subaru WRX
 2. Henry Krolikowski / Cindy Krolikowski / Subaru WRX STi
 3. Mark Cox / Jim Gill / Mitsubishi Evo VI

Expansion to a two-day event 

In 2002, Sno*Drift was expanded to cover two days, with the Sno club rally covering day one and Drift on day two.  In 2003, the event was awarded the ProRally of the Year title by the SCCA.  The 2004 event was marked by heavy snow.

Transition to Rally America 

In 2005, the SCCA transferred organization and marketing of ProRally and ClubRally to Rally America, Inc., with Sno*Drift as the first event of the 2005 calendar, and thus the first event to take place under Rally America organization.

Summary of events 

 Sno*Drift 1973:  SCCA national performance rally
 Sno*Drift 1974:  SCCA national performance rally
 Sno*Drift 1975:  SCCA national performance rally
 Sno*Drift 1979:  SCCA national performance rally
 Sno*Drift 1980:  SCCA national performance rally
 Sno*Drift 1981:  SCCA national performance rally
 Sno*Drift 1982:  SCCA national performance rally
 Sno*Drift 1983:  SCCA national performance rally
 Sno*Drift 1984:  SCCA divisional coefficient 2 rally
 Sno*Drift 1991:  SCCA regional time-speed-distance rally
 Sno*Drift 1992:  SCCA regional time-speed-distance rally
 Sno*Drift 1997:  SCCA 60% national and divisional coefficient 3 rally
 Sno*Drift 1999:  SCCA 60% national and divisional coefficient 3 rally
 Sno*Drift 2000:  SCCA ProRally national rally
 Sno 2000:  SCCA ClubRally coefficient 2 rally
 Drift 2000:  SCCA ClubRally coefficient 3 rally
 Sno*Drift 2001:  SCCA ProRally national rally
 Sno 2001:  SCCA ClubRally coefficient 2 rally
 Drift 2001:  SCCA ClubRally coefficient 3 rally
 Sno*Drift 2002:  SCCA ProRally national rally
 Sno 2002:  SCCA ClubRally coefficient 2 rally
 Drift 2002:  SCCA ClubRally coefficient 3 rally
 Sno*Drift 2003:  SCCA ProRally national rally
 Sno 2003:  SCCA ClubRally coefficient 2 rally
 Drift 2003:  SCCA ClubRally coefficient 3 rally
 Sno*Drift 2004:  SCCA ProRally national rally
 Sno 2004:  SCCA ClubRally coefficient 2 rally
 Drift 2004:  SCCA ClubRally coefficient 3 rally
 Sno*Drift 2005:  Rally America National Rally Championship event
 Sno 2005:  Rally America Central Regional Rally (coefficient 2)
 Drift 2005:  Rally America Central Regional Rally (coefficient 3)
 Sno*Drift 2006:  Rally America National Rally Championship event
 Sno 2006:  Rally America Central Regional Rally (coefficient 2)
 Drift 2006:  Rally America Central Regional Rally (coefficient 3)

See also 

 Rally America
 Rallying

References

External links 
 Sno*Drift web site

Rally competitions in the United States
Tourist attractions in Montmorency County, Michigan
Motorsport in Michigan
Rally America